Shereen Martin is an Irish actress, known for her role as Kirsty Petrie on the BBC drama series The Loch (2017), as Sarah on the Channel 5 and Virgin Media drama series Blood (2018) and as Sophie Miller on the BBC drama series Dublin Murders (2019).

Career
Martineau trained at the RADA.  She graduated in 2002 with a BA in Acting.

Television

Theatre

References

External links
 
 

Alumni of RADA
Irish television actresses
Irish soap opera actresses
Irish stage actresses
Living people
Year of birth missing (living people)